NHL 2004, developed by the EA Black Box studios, is an ice hockey video game. It is the successor to NHL 2003. The game adds three European Elite Leagues: Germany's Deutsche Eishockey Liga (DEL), Sweden's Elitserien (SEL), and Finland's SM-liiga.

Features
The game included many improvements to its gameplay (more realistic puck and rebound control and better checking) and game modes (a completely reworked franchise mode renamed "Dynasty"). In addition to the gameplay improvements, one particular non-gameplay improvement was added. When a team wins the Stanley Cup Finals, a large-scale celebration ensues. It included players skating around the ice holding the Cup over their heads. This then led to the common snapshot of the team and the coaches that holds true in the NHL. A "secret" song ("Shatterday" by Vendetta Red) plays while the animation shows the stats of the players in the picture, ending with the captain. Because of these additions, it was praised as one of the best games in the series to date.

Reception

The game received "favorable" reviews on all platforms according to the review aggregation website Metacritic.

References

External links
 

2003 video games
Electronic Arts games
GameCube games
NHL (video game series)
PlayStation 2 games
Windows games
Xbox games
EA Sports games
Video games set in 2003
Video games set in 2004
Video games set in the United States
Video games set in Canada
Video games developed in Canada